Andrew N. Iwaniuk is a Canadian biologist who largely works in the fields of evolutionary neuroscience, neuroethology and ornithology.

Biography
Iwaniuk was born in Toronto, Ontario, Canada and grew up in Edmonton, Alberta, Canada. He went to the University of Alberta but decided not to stay there, instead he went to Monash University in Melbourne, Australia to complete his Honours degree with John E. Nelson. Later on he returned to Canada to get his master's degree from the University of Lethbridge with Ian Q. Whishaw and Sergio M. Pellis. For his Ph.D., he returned to Australia where he focused his study into the evolution of the bird brain, especially parrots and began development of a large comparative brain collection. Following the completion of his Ph.D., he worked as a post-doc with Douglas Wong-Wylie at the University of Alberta which focus was on the study of neuroanatomy and neurochemistry of birds. He briefly worked as a fellow at the National Museum of Natural History at Washington, D.C. He is currently an associate professor in the Department of Neuroscience at the University of Lethbridge working with grouse, ground squirrels and broad, comparative studies of avian brain anatomy.

Papers

References

Canadian biologists
University of Lethbridge alumni
University of Alberta alumni
Living people
20th-century births
Date of birth missing (living people)
Year of birth missing (living people)